New Jersey State Human Services Police is a statewide police agency in New Jersey.  The Human Services Police are tasked with the responsibility of patrolling, responding and reporting any crimes against people or property within the several psychiatric hospitals and developmental centers in New Jersey. Such facilities include Greystone Park Psychiatric Hospital, New Jersey State Hospital at Trenton and Ancora Psychiatric Hospital.

Functions

Along with psychiatric hospitals, Human Services Police is also responsible for the several developmental centers spread over the state.  These centers are for mentally handicapped individuals and are located throughout the state.

In recent years, Human Services Police have been requested to assist the Division of Youth & Family Services (DYFS).  DYFS falls under the cabinet-level department. Human Services Police officers assist case workers, upon request.  These officers are stationed inside district offices throughout the state.

To properly investigate and charge/arrest individuals, Human Services Police officers are given statewide police powers and authority.  With this authority, Human Services Police are required to enforce Title 39 (motor vehicle law) and 2C (New Jersey Criminal Code) within the grounds of their numerous institutions and anywhere in the state if need be.

See also

 List of law enforcement agencies in New Jersey

External links
 New Jersey Department Of Human Services Police Page
 Press Release on HSPD officers role in assisting case workers
 Overhaul of DYFS

State law enforcement agencies of New Jersey
Specialist police departments of New Jersey